{|

{{Infobox ship characteristics
|Hide header=
|Header caption=
|Ship class=[[Sassaba class tug|Sassaba-class]] harbor tug
|Ship type=
|Ship tonnage=
|Ship displacement=*260 tons
345 tons (full)
|Ship length= 
|Ship beam= 
|Ship height=
|Ship draught= 
|Ship draft= (full)
|Ship depth=
|Ship hold depth=
|Ship decks=
|Ship deck clearance=
|Ship ramps=
|Ship ice class=
|Ship power=
|Ship propulsion=
|Ship sail plan=
|Ship speed=
|Ship range=
|Ship endurance=
|Ship test depth=
|Ship boats=
|Ship capacity=
|Ship troops=
|Ship complement=14
|Ship crew=
|Ship time to activate=
|Ship sensors=
|Ship EW=
|Ship armament=
|Ship armour= 
|Ship armor=
|Ship aircraft=
|Ship aircraft facilities=
|Ship notes=
}}
|}

Originally contracted to be built as YT‑392 on 7 April 1941, 'Mecosta (YTB‑392)' was laid down by Consolidated Shipbuilding Corp., Morris Heights, N.Y., 13 September 1944; launched 28 October 1944: and placed in service 20 January 1945.Mecosta was assigned to Service Squadron 1, Service Force, Atlantic Fleet, for a year of towing and salvage duties from arrival off the European coast 1 March. In March 1946 she transferred to the Naval Operating Base at Bermuda for support service as a large harbor tug for the next 9 years. She was redesignated YTM‑392 on 1 February 1962. Mecosta began operations with the Atlantic Fleet, based from Norfolk, Va., in March 1965, continuing her service to the fleet into 1969.

In 1981, she was acquired for commercial service by Seabrook Towing Incorporated and renamed South Carolina. Seabrook was purchased by McAllister Brothers Towing in 1987, with the tug retaining her name. In 2002, she was acquired by Tucker Roy Marine Towing and Salvage Company and renamed R. Marcel Roy''. She operated under this name until she was scrapped in 2012.

References

Photo gallery at navsource.org

 

Sassaba-class tugs
Ships built in Morris Heights, Bronx
1944 ships
World War II auxiliary ships of the United States